Puglietta is a hamlet (frazione) of the comune of Campagna in the Province of Salerno, Campania, Italy.

History

Geography
The village is situated in a hill zone in the central side of the municipality, between the hamlets of Quadrivio and Serradarce, on a road linking Eboli to Contursi Terme.

See also
Campagna
Camaldoli
Quadrivio
Romandola-Madonna del Ponte
Santa Maria La Nova
Serradarce

Frazioni of the Province of Salerno
Localities of Cilento